These are the Kowloon East results of the 2016 Hong Kong Legislative Council election. The election was held on 4 September 2016 and all 5 seats in Kowloon East where consisted of Wong Tai Sin District and Kwun Tong District were contested. The Pro-Beijing camp retained the majority of the Kowloon East seats. The Democratic Party, Democratic Alliance for the Betterment and Progress of Hong Kong, Federation of Trade Unions and Civic Party each secured their party's incumbent seat, as well as independent Paul Tse who won the last seat in the last election, with Wilson Or and Jeremy Tam first elected to the Legislative Council.

Overall results
Before election:

Change in composition:

Candidates list

Opinion polling

See also
Legislative Council of Hong Kong
Hong Kong legislative elections
2016 Hong Kong legislative election

References

2016 Hong Kong legislative election